Cnemolia is a genus of longhorn beetles of the subfamily Lamiinae.

 Cnemolia albicollis Breuning, 1969
 Cnemolia bertrandi Breuning, 1956
 Cnemolia camerunensis Breuning, 1977
 Cnemolia densenigromaculata Breuning, 1970
 Cnemolia douceti Lepesme & Breuning, 1955
 Cnemolia grisea Breuning, 1952
 Cnemolia guineensis Franz, 1942
 Cnemolia heyrovskyi Breuning, 1938
 Cnemolia ituriensis Breuning, 1972
 Cnemolia jansseni Breuning, 1954
 Cnemolia lateralis Aurivillius, 1907
 Cnemolia leonensis Breuning, 1935
 Cnemolia marmorata Breuning, 1942
 Cnemolia marshalli Breuning, 1935
 Cnemolia mima Jordan, 1903
 Cnemolia mirei Breuning, 1969
 Cnemolia nyassana Breuning, 1935
 Cnemolia obliquevittata Breuning, 1978
 Cnemolia onca (Quedenfeldt, 1882)
 Cnemolia schoutedeni (Breuning, 1935)
 Cnemolia signata Breuning, 1938
 Cnemolia silacea Breuning, 1938
 Cnemolia tubericollis Breuning, 1942

References

Ancylonotini